XHLLV-FM is a radio station on 89.3 FM in Tula, Hidalgo, part of the Radio y Televisión de Hidalgo state radio network.

History
XHLLV received its most recent permit in 1999.

References

Radio stations in Hidalgo (state)
Public radio in Mexico